Stanley Hagen (March 11, 1940 – January 20, 2009) was a Canadian politician.  He served as Member of the Legislative Assembly for the Comox Valley riding in the Legislative Assembly of British Columbia as a member of the BC Liberal Party.

He was the Minister of Agriculture and Lands when he died. During his political career, he served as minister for 10 different ministries, including Minister of Tourism, Sports and the Arts, Minister for Children and Family Development, Minister of Sustainable Resource Management, and Minister of Human Resources.

He was first elected in the 1986 provincial election as a Social Credit Member of the Legislative Assembly (MLA), and served in the cabinet of Bill Vander Zalm. His cabinet positions included Minister of Advanced Education, Minister of Economic Development, and Minister of Education. Hagen was best known for being integral in the creation of Science World and for his support of the TRIUMF particle accelerator at the University of British Columbia.

He was defeated in the 1991 election when all but seven Socred MLAs were defeated. Hagen returned to provincial politics by winning his seat in the 2001 provincial election and was re-elected in 2005.

On November 24, 2004, it was announced that Hagen had been diagnosed with prostate cancer and was undergoing treatment.

On January 20, 2009, at the age of 68, Stan Hagen died of a massive heart attack.

In August 2009, Hagen was inducted into the Comox Valley Walk of Achievement. December 2011, Hagen was memorialized by the Salvation Army, which renamed its Victoria Family Centre the "Stan Hagen Centre for Families".

While still in office, he was honoured by the K'omoks First Nation with the name “Ti’ axwsam" (Red Cod).

References

1940 births
2009 deaths
British Columbia Liberal Party MLAs
British Columbia Social Credit Party MLAs
Canadian people of Norwegian descent
Education ministers of British Columbia
Members of the Executive Council of British Columbia
People from New Westminster
21st-century Canadian politicians